Maksim Georgiyevich Arap (born 19 March 1981) is a former Russian football player.

External links
 

1981 births
Living people
Russian footballers
FC Zenit Saint Petersburg players
Russian Premier League players
FC Metallurg Lipetsk players
FC Dynamo Saint Petersburg players
Association football midfielders
FC Petrotrest players
FC Lukhovitsy players
FC Sheksna Cherepovets players
FC Zenit-2 Saint Petersburg players